Threemilestone is a small village in the civil parish of Kenwyn, located precisely three miles west of Truro, the only city in Cornwall, England, United Kingdom. Threemilestone has grown in recent years, as housing estates to the west have been developed. Between Truro and Threemilestone there is a continuous line of schools, colleges and industrial estates, including Truro College and Richard Lander School. Furthermore the village also houses a primary school (known locally: Threemilestone Primary School).

Amenities 
In Threemilestone itself there is a central area of shops and facilities which include a Spar shop, a Co-Op Supermarket, a baker, Fish & Chip Shop, Butchers, Chemist, Doctor's Surgery (Lander Medical Practise), Launderette, Hair Salon, Barbers (Threemilestone Barber Shop), Post Office, Community Centre, Victoria Inn (Public House), and Social Club, Methodist church, a Dental Practise, and Chinese takeaway.

Threemilestone is also the location for a park-and-ride scheme that serves the A390. The park-and-ride resulted in an estimated removal of 118,000 cars from the road during its first 9 months of operation. The park and ride is, therefore, an important piece of infrastructure, for the residents of Threemilestone and people travelling into Truro.

It is also home to the West Truro Retail Park, businesses including: Poundstretcher, Home Bargains, Oak furnitureland, DFS, Wickes, Matalan and Cabaña (Mexican Restaurant).

Leisure 
The village also has a football club called Threemilestone A.F.C. which currently runs four sides, a first team, reserve team, veterans side and a youth team. The club currently play their home games at Boscawen Park in Truro, however the hope is to return to the Polstain Road pitch in the future. There are a few parks in the area including Leap Park and Swing Park in the west side of Threemilestone.

Gallery

References

External links

Villages in Cornwall